Bandarakottai (or Pandarakottai) is a Village Panjayat. Which is situated in Panruti taluk, Cuddalore District, Tamil Nadu in India.

About Bandarakottai
Bandrakottai is a village in Panruti Taluk in Cuddalore District of Tamil Nadu State, India.
It is located 29 km west of the District headquarters Cuddalore. 6 km from Panruti.
188 km from State capital Chennai Bandarakottai and postal head office is Puthupet
(CDL) .
Nearest villages are Anguchettypalayam (2 km), 
Manapakkam (2 km), 
Pudhupettai (1.5 km), 
Panapakkam (2 km), Chinnapettai
(3 km) are the nearby areas or places to
Bandrakottai.
Panruti, Viluppuram, Nellikuppam, 
Cuddalore are the nearby Cities to
Bandarakottai.

This Place is in the border of the
Cuddalore District and Pondicherry
District. Pondicherry District
Nettapakkam is East towards this
place. Also it is in the Border of
other district Villupuram. It is near to the Pondicherry State Border.

Sub Villages of Bandarakottai
 Chinna-Ammapettai,
 Ammapettai,
 Vaaniyampalayam,
 Kuchippalayam

References 

Villages in Cuddalore district